Serinus is a genus of small birds in the finch family Fringillidae found in West Asia, Europe and Africa. The birds usually have some yellow in their plumage. The genus was introduced in 1816 by the German naturalist Carl Ludwig Koch. Its name is New Latin for "canary-yellow".

Many species were at one time assigned to the genus but it became clear from phylogenetic studies of mitochondrial and nuclear DNA sequences that the genus was polyphyletic. This was confirmed by Dario Zuccon and coworkers in a comprehensive study of the finch family published in 2012. The authors suggested splitting the genus into two monophyletic groups, a proposal that was accepted by the International Ornithologists' Union. The genus Serinus was restricted to the European serin and seven other species while a larger clade from Africa and Arabia was assigned to the resurrected genus Crithagra.

The genus contains eight species:

References

External links

Serin videos, photos and sounds on the Internet Bird Collection

 
Fringillidae
Bird genera
Taxa named by Carl Ludwig Koch